Caelatura is a genus of minute sea snails, marine gastropod mollusks or micromollusks in the family Barleeiidae.

Species
Species within the genus Caelatura include:
 Caelatura albertoi Santos & Absalão, 2007
 Caelatura aulakion Santos & Absalão, 2007
 Caelatura barcellosi Absalão & Rios, 1995
 Caelatura carinata Santos & Absalão, 2007
 Caelatura gerhardtae (De Jong & Coomans, 1988)
 Caelatura microstoma (R. B. Watson, 1886)
 Caelatura noxia Santos & Absalão, 2007
 Caelatura pernambucensis (R. B. Watson, 1886)
 Caelatura phrix Santos & Absalão, 2007
 Caelatura rustica (R. B. Watson, 1886)
 Caelatura speculabunda Absalão, 2002
 Caelatura spirocordata Absalão & Rios, 1995
 Caelatura tigrina Absalão, 2002
 Caelatura tupi Santos & Absalão, 2007

References

 Absalao Silva, R. & Rios E., 1995. Descriptions of two new species of Caelatura (Gastropoda, Rissoidea, Barleiidae) from Brazil. Apex 10(2-3): 87-93

External links
 Jousseaume F. (1886). Coquilles du Haut-Sénégal. Bulletin de la Société Zoologique de France. 11: 471-502, pls 12-14
 Ponder W. F. (1983). Review of the genera of the Barleeidae (Mollusca: Gastropoda: Rissoacea). Records of the Australian Museum 35: 231-281